Shakeela Bano Bhopali was an Indian actress and the first woman Qawwal of India. She was born in 1942 in Bhopal, a town that since 1956 has been Capital of newly formed state of Madhya Pradesh. She is known for her acting in Jageer, Tarzaan, Badshah and Raaka. She lost her voice in the Bhopal disaster in 1984 and died on 16 December 2002 at St. George Hospital after a massive cardiac attack.

References

External links
 

1962 births
2002 deaths
Hindi-language singers
Indian women playback singers
Actresses from Bhopal
Bhopal disaster
Musicians from Bhopal